Mesothuriidae is a family of echinoderms belonging to the order Holothuriida.

Genera
There are two genera recognised in the family Mesothuriidae:
 Mesothuria Ludwig, 1894
 Zygothuria Perrier, 1898

References

Holothuriida
Echinoderm families